Chorabari Lake, also known as Gandhi Sarovar, was a glacial lake at the snout of the Chorabari Glacier at an altitude of . On 17 June 2013, the moraine holding back the waters of the lake gave way and vast quantities of water cascaded down the valley below, causing a catastrophic flash flood. The lake did not reform after the event because much of the moraine had been washed away, leaving a boulder-strewn flat area with a small stream flowing through it.

Description
The instability of the alpine soils and deforestation of the valley sides caused large quantities of glacial debris and sediment to accumulate and form a moraine at the foot of the glacier. Like many others, the Chorabari Glacier has been shrinking during the 21st century, and by 2013 the snout of the glacier had retreated several hundred metres from the moraine. The water in the lake mostly accumulated from rainfall and melting snow in its catchment area.

Gandhi Sarovar
Chorabari Lake was renamed Gandhi Sarovar after some of Mahatma Gandhi's ashes were scattered in the lake. This caused many pilgrims visiting the temple at Kedarnath to undertake the trek to the lake.

June 2013
The monsoon rainfall was very heavy in Uttarakhand in June 2013. On the morning of 17 June, an avalanche swept into the lake, putting immense pressure on the dam, which then burst. Water cascaded into the valley below, taking with it enormous boulders and great quantities of debris. The whole lake emptied in five to ten minutes. The lake did not reform after the event, as much of the moraine had been washed away. What remains of Chorabari Lake is a boulder-strewn flat area with a small rivulet flowing through it.

See also
2013 North India floods

References

Landforms of Uttarakhand